Bunter Hund (German for "coloured dog") may refer to:

 Bunter Hund, the International Short Film Festival in Munich
 Bunter Hund, a 2007 studio album by Reinhard Mey
 Bunter Hund, a particular hand in the card game of Skat
 Der Bunter Hund, a children's literature magazine by Beltz & Gelberg
 Bunte Hunde, a 1995 film by Lars Becker